Skorobište or Skorobišta (Скоробишта) is a village in Prizren Municipality, Kosovo.

Geography
It lies in the eastern slopes of the Kabaš Mountain, at an altitude of 1185 m. It is part of the Prizrenski Podgor region. It is located near Prizren.

Demographics
It had 1128 inhabitants according to the 2011 census, with an Albanian majority and Bosniak minority.

History
The village existed in the Serbian Middle Ages. It was mentioned in Emperor Stefan Dušan's charter dated 26 April 1348 as part of the metochion of the Church of St. Peter in Koriša to Hilandar, along with Planjane, Sištevac, Črneljevo. There had been a quarrel between Skorobište, which was part of the estate of the Monastery of the Holy Archangels and Ljubiždnja, which was part of the estate of the Church of St. Peter in Koriša, about a mountain access. From it, it is clear that the people of Skorobište mostly dealt with cattle breeding. Skorobište later became part of the estate of the Monastery of St. Peter in Koriša.

In the Ottoman period, the village was part of the Ljubinje barjak.  In 1874, it was reported that this historical Christian village had no Christian inhabitants. In 1877, the village had 60 families; the Muslim families had converted 110 years prior (ca. 1767). The locals didn't work on Christian saint feast days, and married only on weekdays, and never Fridays. In 1882, there was an old church, and a newly built school in the village, but no teachers. During the First World War the local Muslim school functioned, supported financially by Bulgarian Ministry of Education. The inhabitants did not marry with Turks.

In August 1958, below the Crni Vrh and above Skorobište, fields had been dug up and tens of thousands young plants had been removed and left, destroyed.

Demographics
The village is one of seven mixed Albanian-Bosniak villages near Prizren. The 1971 census saw the Slavic Muslim inhabitants being largely assimilated into Albanians. It had 1128 inhabitants according to the 2011 census, of whom 67,91% Albanians and 26,86% Bosniaks.

The Slavic Muslim population, known as Podgorani or Prekokamci, living in Skorobište, Grnčare, and Novo Selo, did not largely leave during and after the Kosovo War.

Culture
The local Slavic speech (Podgorski) is part of the Prizren–South Morava speech, of the Shtokavian dialect of Serbo-Croatian. The Albanians speak the Northeastern Gheg sub-dialect of Albanian.

Notes

References

Villages in Prizren